The Verona Apartments are a large multiunit residential building at the corner of Dwight and Allendale Streets in the North End of Springfield, Massachusetts.  The four story apartment house was built in 1906 by a consortium of construction and real estate interests in the Classical Revival style.  The exterior is built from white brick, and features alternating flat and rounded sections on both of its street-facing elevations.  The building went through a succession of owners, with a number of them losing the building due to foreclosure by mortgage holders.

The Verona's resident population underwent changes that echoed Springfield's changing demographics.  Its early tenants were almost all working class: teachers, retail store clerks, and factory workers, from a variety of ethnic backgrounds.  However, a few small business owners also lived there.  By the 1980s Springfield's North End had the highest proportion of substandard housing, and The Verona was included in major urban redevelopment plans, along with the nearby Calhoun Apartments.  The Verona was sold in 1983 to Housing Rehab, Inc., which began rehabilitation work in 1983.  The interior renovations done pursuant to the redevelopment plan destroyed all historic value inside the building, gutting it and replacing the interior with modern construction.  Woodwork around its exterior entrances was also lost.

The Verona and Calhoun were then transferred to Dwight Manor Associates, whose principals included individuals who had overseen the rehabilitation.  Property taxes fell into arrears in 1997, and the city took the two properties by tax foreclosure in 2004.  In 2006 the city transferred them to the Jefferson Park Limited Partnership for use as low and moderate income housing.

See also
National Register of Historic Places listings in Springfield, Massachusetts
National Register of Historic Places listings in Hampden County, Massachusetts

References

National Register of Historic Places in Springfield, Massachusetts
Neoclassical architecture in Massachusetts
Residential buildings completed in 1906
Apartment buildings in Springfield, Massachusetts
1906 establishments in Massachusetts